Jade Point is a gently sloping rocky point forming the southern limit of Eyrie Bay and the east extremity of Yatrus Promontory, Trinity Peninsula in Antarctica. It was named descriptively by the UK Antarctic Place-Names Committee, as the lower slopes of the point are permanently sheathed in greenish-tinged ice, jade being a name for some types of green stone.

Map
 Trinity Peninsula. Scale 1:250000 topographic map No. 5697. Institut für Angewandte Geodäsie and British Antarctic Survey, 1996.

References

Headlands of Trinity Peninsula